Aubrey Linne (born April 19, 1939) was a tight end in the National Football League and Canadian Football League from 1961 to 1963.

After playing college football at Texas Christian University, Aubrey Linne joined the Baltimore Colts in 1961 but was put on waivers in 1962 after playing only one game. Linne was picked up that year by the Toronto Argonauts when he enjoyed his best season with 21 catches for 401 yards and a 19.1 yards per catch average in 6 games. However, in 1963, he played only 4 games for the Argos. He went to the Edmonton Eskimos, where he played 8 games and obtained 16 catches for 200 yards and a 12.5 yards per catch average. He also served as the Eskimos'punter: 43 punts for a 40.7 yards per punt average, a top one of 73 yards and 2 single points. However, he was replaced as the punter the following year by Marcel Deleeuw and never played again. He was probably the tallest player in the CFL at that time at 6 feet 7 inches.

References

1939 births
Living people
Baltimore Colts players
Canadian football punters
Edmonton Elks players
Toronto Argonauts players